Michelle Anderson D'Aloisio (born 27 January 1972) is a former professional tennis player from South Africa.

Biography
Anderson, who grew up in Benoni, was a girls' singles semi-finalist at the 1989 Wimbledon Championships.

On the professional tour, Anderson competed in ITF circuit events and was most successful in doubles, with a best ranking of 124 in the world. She won eight ITF doubles titles with countrywoman Robyn Field and 13 in total. Her career was curtailed by a wrist injury, which caused her to miss much of 1990 and 1991.

From 1994 to 1997 she played college tennis in the United States for the University of Georgia. A four-time doubles All-American, she was a member of Georgia's NCAA Division I Women's Tennis Championship winning team in 1994.

She is now living in the United States.

ITF finals

Doubles (13-7)

References

External links
 
 

1972 births
Living people
South African female tennis players
Georgia Lady Bulldogs tennis players
People from Benoni
South African emigrants to the United States
White South African people
Sportspeople from Gauteng
20th-century South African women